John Dennett (1790–1852) was an English inventor and antiquary. He invented Dennett's Life-Saving Rocket Apparatus for saving shipwrecked crewmen in 1832, and was made custodian of Carisbrooke Castle. He contributed to journal of British Archaeological Association.

Life 
John Dennett of Newport, Isle of Wight, was born in 1790.

"Dennett's" rockets 
In 1832, or about 1826, he invented the life-saving rocket apparatus (known as "Dennett's") for conveying a rope from the shore to a shipwrecked crew. Manby had previously employed for this purpose a grappling shot fired from a mortar. Dennett's apparatus "resembled the old skyrocket", but had "an iron case instead of a paper one, and a pole eight feet long instead of a mere stick"; it weighed 23 lbs. (10.4 kg), was propelled by 9 lbs. (4 kg) of composition, and had a range of 250 yards (228.6 m). Dennett subsequently increased the range to 400 yards (365.8 m) by placing two rockets side by side on the same stick. But the action of these parallel rockets was unsatisfactory. A ship's crew off Bembridge, in the Isle of Wight, having been saved by means of Dennett's rocket, the board of customs had the apparatus supplied in 1834 to several coastguard stations. It was superseded in official use by the adoption of Boxer's rocket in 1865. Dennett's rockets are said to have been sent to all parts of the world, and to have won for their inventor several honours from foreign sovereigns.

Other work 
A short time before his death, Dennett was appointed (apparently as some recognition of his services as an inventor) custodian of Carisbrooke Castle. He had a practical knowledge of antiquities, and was a corresponding member of the British Archaeological Association. He contributed to its journal (vols. i–v) short accounts of various antiquities found in England, and read a paper on the barrows of the Isle of Wight at the Winchester congress of the association in 1845.

He died on 10 July 1852, aged sixty-two.

See also 

 Lifeboat (rescue)
 Lifesaving

References

Sources 

 Ballantyne, Robert M.; Dibdin, Charles; Thorson, Alfred T. (1911). "Life-Boat and Life-Saving Service". In Chisholm, Hugh (ed.). Encyclopædia Britannica. Vol. 16 (11th ed.). Cambridge UP. p. 605.
 Chambers, Robert, ed. (1886). "Life Mortars and Rockets". Chambers's Encyclopædia. Rev. ed. Vol. 10. London: W. & R. Chambers. pp. 605–606.
 Ross, John M., ed. (1878). "Life-Saving Apparatus". The Globe Encyclopædia of Universal Information. Vol. 4. Edinburgh: Thomas C. Jack, Grange Publishing Works. pp. 97–98.
 Wroth, W. W.; Cox, R. C. (2004). "Dennett, John (1789–1852), inventor of a life-saving rocket, and antiquary". Oxford Dictionary of National Biography. Oxford UP. Retrieved 7 September 2022.
 The Cornhill Magazine, Vol. 28. July–December 1873. London: Smith, Elder & Co. p. 72.
 The Gentleman's Magazine, Vol. 38, New Series. July–December 1852. London: John Bowyer Nichols and Son. pp. 319–320.
 The Journal of the British Archaeological Association, Vol. 9. 1854. London: J. R. Smith. p. 111.

Attribution:

1790 births
1852 deaths
19th-century inventors
English inventors